Laser Chess is a two-player, strategy video game from 1987, modeled as a board game with chess-like pieces, most of which have mirrored surfaces, and one of which is a laser cannon. Laser Chess first appeared in Compute!'s Atari ST Disk & Magazine in 1987, written in Modula-2, winning the $5,000 first prize in a programming competition held by the magazine. 

Ports of the game written in BASIC and machine language were published in the June 1987 issue of Compute! for the Amiga, Commodore 64, Apple II, and Atari 8-bit family as type-in programs. Laser Chess has been re-implemented many times over the years, including a variant Advanced Laser Chess with a larger board and additional pieces, or the new variant "LASER CHESS: Deflection" bringing a level editor, more and more pieces like portals available on Steam.

Gameplay
Players take alternate turns taking two actions with their pieces.  An action consists of moving a piece vertically or laterally, rotating a piece 90 degrees, or "firing" the laser cannon.  A teleporter piece can teleport pieces that it lands on.

Moving a distance of one square takes one action; moving two squares takes two actions. Since a player has only two actions per turn, the maximum distance a piece can be moved on one turn is two squares.  Pieces can be moved forward, backward, left, or right, but not diagonally.  However, a player can effectively move a piece diagonally by using two actions—forward and right, for example.

Firing the laser
On a player's turn, the player can elect to fire the laser cannon. Firing the laser cannon takes only one action, but can be done only once per turn. Therefore, a player may want to use the first action in a turn to aim the laser, rotate a reflecting piece to set up a reflected shot, or move another piece into position. Laser beams are absorbed if they hit the edge of the board.

The laser will bounce off any mirrored piece, so both a player's own and the opponent's pieces may be used to set up a shot.  Since a player is focused on creating a path from that player's laser cannon to a target of interest, the player must be aware that a return path is also created for the opponent at the same time.

Some mirrored pieces can be destroyed by aiming the beam at one of their non-reflective sides, while others will simply absorb the beam harmlessly.  Each player also has a beam splitter.

Legacy
In an MS-DOS re-implementation by Peter Venable (1994), the pieces move like normal Chess pieces on a 9x9 board, with the laser moving like a king, and a turn consists of making any number of rotations to one's pieces followed by either playing a Chess move or firing the laser.

See also
Lazer Maze (1982)
Deflektor (1987)
Khet (2005), board game

References

1987 video games
Amiga games
Apple II games
Atari 8-bit family games
Atari ST games
Commodore 64 games
Video games developed in the United States
Video games with available source code